Maciąg is a Polish-language surname derived from an augmentative of a  given name and which literally means "big Maciej". Notable people with this surname include:

References

Polish-language surnames